is a Japanese magical girl anime television series produced by Toei Animation. It is the seventeenth installment of the Pretty Cure franchise and the first exclusive series in the Reiwa period. It premiered on ANN on February 2, 2020, succeeding Star Twinkle Pretty Cure in its initial time slot. It is the second series in the franchise to focus on nature as its main topic after Futari wa Pretty Cure Splash Star, with elements and medicine used for the Cures' main motifs. It was succeeded by Tropical-Rouge! Pretty Cure on February 28, 2021.

Toei Animation Inc. licensed the series outside Japan, with Crunchyroll streaming the series starting on June 28, 2020, in select countries. It marks as the second series (excluding Smile PreCure! and DokiDoki! PreCure) to be released under the Pretty Cure name since Futari wa Pretty Cure.

Story
Its ruler, Queen Teatine, entrusted the care of her daughter Rate to three Healing Animals - Rabirin, Pegitan and Nyatoran - who are on a mission to go to the surface world and find three people whose hearts can resonate with their paws and can partner with them. While on Earth, both Nodoka and the fairies witness an attack from the Byogens and in a sudden twist of fate, Rabirin meets up with Nodoka, who despite her somewhat frail condition, is determined to protect others. This resonated with Rabirin and resulted in Nodoka becoming the Pretty Cure foretold in legend, Cure Grace. Joined in by Chiyu (Cure Fontaine), Hinata (Cure Sparkle) and Asumi (Cure Earth), the four girls form the Healin' Good Pretty Cure team in order to fight against the threat of the Byogens and protect all life on Earth along with the Healing Garden.

Characters

Healin' Good Pretty Cures
 

The main protagonist. The Pretty Cure of Flowers; before the events of the series, 13-year-old Nodoka had succumbed to an unknown illness caused by a Dark Seed from a MegaByogen that left her hospitalized during her childhood. As she recovers years later, her frail condition made her parents worry about her life and decide to move to Sukoyaka City in order for her to fully recover. She is very calm and goes at her own pace, and strives to try many different things, but does not have the athletic ability to accomplish most of them. Above all this, she has a very kind heart and just wants to be of use to someone. Her fairy partner is Rabirin. Her theme color is pink.

 

The Pretty Cure of Water; 14-year-old Chiyu lives in Sukoyaka whose family runs a Onsen Ryokan in town. She has a hygienic and cheerful lifestyle. She's the older sister type who, if she sees anything wrong, will do anything to help. She's very serious with a strong sense of responsibility and will try to do everything herself. She is sporty, being the ace of the school's track and field team, and smart as well, especially when it comes to science. Her fairy partner is Pegitan. Her theme color is blue.

 

The Pretty Cure of Light; 13-year-old Hinata lives in Sukoyaka whose family runs an Animal Clinic and a Juice Bar. Bright, outgoing and friendly, she tends to speak her mind, relevant or not. She is an honest girl, always apologizing once she realizes she did something wrong. She is not good at studying. She absolutely loves fashion and cosmetics but is so fond of it that she is not great at judging it fairly. Her fairy partner is Nyatoran. Her theme color is yellow.

 

The Pretty Cure of Wind; Asumi is a 20-year-old blond girl born from the spirit of the Healing Garden after Queen Teatine's wish for someone to protect her daughter Rate. She has a resemblance to the first Pretty Cure that Queen Teatine teamed up with several millennia ago. As she was an entity born from the Healing Garden, she is both calm and friendly although a bit clueless sometimes. When depressed, she starts to become transparent and slowly fades away. Her friends need to cheer her up for her to be in high spirits once more. Also, her younger peers have to teach her how to adapt to the modern world while fighting against the Byogens. Her fairy partner is Rate. Her theme color is purple.

Healing Garden
The  is a magical place ruled by Queen Teatine until it was invaded by the Byogens.

A pink rabbit-like fairy and Nodoka's fairy partner. She has a strong sense of justice and very high-spirited, but she makes mistakes sometimes.

A blue penguin-like fairy and Chiyu's fairy partner. He is very intelligent, but is shy and lacking in confidence. Despite being modest, he will do what he can if things are not working out right. He loves hot springs.

A yellow cat-like fairy and Hinata's fairy partner. Like Hinata, he is very free-spirited and says whatever is on his mind. He is also a show-off who tries to act cool.

A brown dog-like fairy who is Asumi's fairy partner and the  She does not speak and can only bark like a normal dog, but others can use a stethoscope to hear her inner voice. She becomes sick when a MegaByogen is born, but can be healed by using the power of rescued Elements.

 
Rate's mother. She is an adult Afghan Hound-like fairy and the ruler of the Healing Garden. The Healing Animals reveal that she is severely wounded after her clash with King Byogen and the only survivor who remained in her homeland. Later on, she is revealed to be the partner of the first Pretty Cure predating the trio. In episode 43, she heads to Earth to confront Neo King Byogen and traps him in a forcefield along with her Healing Animal friends. However, the king breaks out and she is among those absorbed into him. Nevertheless, everyone's determination to live frees them from the king.

A lion-like fairy and one of Queen Teatine's knights.

A tiger-like fairy and one of Queen Teatine's knights.

An elderly monkey-like fairy and the elder of the Healing Garden.

A sparrow-like fairy from the Healing Garden.

A dormouse-like fairy from the Healing Garden.

A ferret-like fairy from the Healing Garden.

A hamster-like fairy from the Healing Garden.

Elemental Spirits
The  are the spirits residing in the environment and objects. The Byogens corrupts them with NanoByogen which turn them into MegaByogens. After being purified, the spirits grant Elemental Bottles that the Cures can use to treat and heal Rate. The voices of these characters are Yumiri Hanamori, Sayaka Senbongi and Ai Furihata.

An Elemental Spirit that resides in the flowers.

An Elemental Spirit that resides in the trees and forest.

An Elemental Spirit that resides in the water source.

An Elemental Spirit that resides in the glass and mirrors.

An Elemental Spirit that resides in bubbles.

An Elemental Spirit that resides in fruits and crops.

An Elemental Spirit that resides in raindrops.

An Elemental Spirit that resides in things that produce ice.

An Elemental Spirit that resides in gemstones and rocks.

An Elemental Spirit that resides in electronics and gadgets.

An Elemental Spirit residing in things that produce wind.

An Elemental Spirit that resides in leaves.

An Elemental Spirit that resides in things that produce fire.

An Elemental Spirit that resides in things that catch sunlight.

An Elemental Spirit residing in things that produce air.

An Elemental Spirit residing in things that produce sound.

An Elemental Spirit that resides at beaches.

Byogens
The series' main antagonists. Their motive is to infect the Healing Garden and corrupt the world with its epidemic to reawaken King Byogen. Its name came from the Japanese word , meaning "origin of (a) disease". They are based on demons.

Leaders

The leader of the Byogens and the main antagonist of the series, a ruthless demon who was defeated by the Pretty Cure preceding Nodoka and her friends a long time ago when he almost conquered the Healing Garden and defeated Teatine, which caused him to lose his body and end up as a dormant spirit. In order to re-obtain his body, he assigned his minions to spread disease to the Earth to complete his body. In episode 39, he is apparently defeated by the Cures, leaving Guaiwaru to anoint himself king. However, it is revealed in episode 41 that the Cures only destroyed a part of his body and he already knew of Guaiwaru's treachery and planned to absorb him to regain his true form and power once Guaiwaru enhanced himself further, with Shindoine assisting him in that plan. In episode 42, he absorbs Daruizen after the latter was defeated by the Cures, evolving and enhancing himself further into . Subsequently, he infects all of Sukoyaka City and gradually undermines Earth before Queen Teatine and her servants trap him in a forcefield to temporarily stop his progress. He then breaks out, absorbs the Cures, Queen Teatine and Rate, and instantly infects the whole world. Nevertheless, his victims break free before the Cures purify him, destroying him permanently.

Terra Byogens
 are demonic beings born after a MegaByogen Dark Seed infected its host and matured for a certain time, leaving its host and assuming its human form. As they all serve King Byogen as his generals, they aim to spread disease to Earth in order to reawaken him. They use Nano Byogen to corrupt Elemental Spirits to create giant monsters called Mega Byogen. Said monsters can be enhanced with crystals called Mega Parts which can be harvested from them. Once enhanced with a Mega Part themselves, they can infect humans and turn them into Giga Byogen. All TerraByogens have scorpion-like tails while the trio has horns that come out of their heads and wear red coats.

 
A calm TerraByogen boy with green hair with a laidback attitude who speaks softly and looks down upon the Healing Animals. He can throw projectiles by creating dark orbs. It is later revealed that he was born from Nodoka after she was infected by a MegaByogen Dark Seed and is responsible for her illness a few years ago. In episode 33, he was forced to enhance himself with a Mega Part on instructions to gain more power, gaining the ability to turn humans into GigaByogens like the other two generals. In episodes 41 and 42, Daruizen attempts to seek Nodoka’s protection when the revived King Byogen attempted to absorb him but is refused as the Pretty Cure called him out on having no intention to stop being evil. He enhances himself with multiple Mega Parts to battle the Cures, only to be purified back to his usual form before being killed by King Byogen with the monster absorbing his remains. His name is based on the word "Darui" (だるい), which means sluggish or languid.

 
A wicked TerraByogen woman with purple hair who is very vastly devoted to King Byogen as his oldest subordinate, taking offense towards any of her allies speaking against him. After being ignored for so long, she used her only Mega Part to further evolve herself, gaining the ability to corrupt humans and turn them into GigaByogens. In episode 41, it is revealed that she assisted King Byogen in his plan to absorb a treacherous Guaiwaru to regain his body and power. In episode 43, she enhances herself further to engage the four Cures but ends up getting purified by them back to her original state as particles which Cure Earth absorbs to develop a vaccine for them to use against King Byogen. Her name is based on the word "Shindoi" (しんどい), which means tired or bothersome in Kansai dialect.

 
A fierce muscular TerraByogen man with orange hair who solves problems by crushing his foes with brute force. In episode 32, he enhances himself with a Mega Part to prove he is better than Shindoine, also gaining the ability to turn humans into GigaByogens. In episode 39, he uses the Cures to defeat King Byogen for him as part of his power play and becomes . Guaiwaru subsequently overpowers the Cures as they flee, turning his attention to infect Sukoyaka City with multiple MegaByogens before the Cures intervene. Guaiwaru nearly killed them before he ends up being absorbed by King Byogen, who knew of his treachery, faked his demise, and used him to create a new body. His name is based on the phrase , meaning bad health.

 
A cocky humanoid TerraByogen nutria who was infected by a Byogen Dark Seed spawned by one of Daruizen's MegaByogen. Unlike the other three generals, he does not have horns but wears a jacket, a black shirt and slippers. He is a strong fighter who battles for fun and he sees the other generals as his family; the latter is later revealed to be a ruse to prove he is better than the others. In episode 20, he was purified by Cure Earth using the Healing Hurricane.

A humanoid TerraByogen crow created by Daruizen when he fused a Mega Part with a bird, he also has a fear of heights. His name is based on the word "nebusoku"(寝不足) which means "lack of sleep". He was purified by Cure Earth.

A TerraByogen boy created by Daruizen when he inserted a Mega Part into Nodoka's body. His name is based on the word "Kedarui" (気だるい) which means "languid" or "listless". He was purified by the Healing Oasis.

The series main monsters summoned by the Byogens. When they're defeated by the Pretty Cure they say

Cures' family members

 
 
Nodoka's father. He works as an architect.

 
 
Nodoka's mother. She started working as a delivery truck driver after the family moved to Sukoyaka City.

 
Chiyu's father.

 
 
Chiyu's mother. She is the owner of the Sawaizumi Hot Spring Inn.

 
Chiyu's younger brother.

 
Chiyu's grandfather.

 
Chiyu's grandmother.

 
Hinata's father. He is the owner of his family Animal Clinic.

 
 
Hinata's older brother. He works as a veterinarian.

 
 
Hinata's older sister. She is the owner of the "Café Wonderful Juice" juice bar, and a pet groomer.

Others

Nodoka, Chiyu, and Hinata's headroom teacher and Kota's father.

 & 

Hinata's friends.

Nodoka's classmate who tries to get the latest scoop in school as its newspaper editor. He attempts to stalk Nodoka, who he believes is involved with the Byogens' attacks.

 & 

Nodoka, Chiyu and Hinata's classmates. Ryoko is a member of the school's athletics club.

An employee at the Sawaizumi Hot Spring Inn.

A guest at the Sawaizumi Hot Spring Inn. A pattern of a person with a big heart around encouraging a depressed employee. He was attacked by Guaiwaru and turned into Gigabyogen. The owner of Moko, the dog who caused a bit of a ruckus.

An artist who travelled to France to learn more about the art she loved.

She is a kind lady who feels sentimental whenever she misses Honoo.

He is Orie's husband, and also a friendly and loving man. He used to work in the neighboring town but returned after he married Orie.

A foreigner who visits Japan with her parents and stayed at Sawaizumi Hot Spring Inn. She plans to move to Japan in the near future, but at first she was worried about leaving her hometown and living in a new land. After that, she gradually grows closer to Chiyu, who listened to her worries, and finally made new friends while playing in the park.

A young transfer student who discovers Pegitan, who was pretending to be a plushie, on a bench. She takes him home and plays with him, naming him , but she soon learns he is real, and becomes attached to him.

Riri's mother.

The leader of a hot air balloon team.

,  & 

The other members of the hot air balloon team.

Kyosei's son.

Kota's friend.

 

A girl who is the rainbow-colored Cure from Tropical-Rouge! Pretty Cure. She is summoned by Rate to assist the Healin' Good Pretty Cure team in their battle against a MegaByogen pack, though she is knocked out by the monsters.

Movie Characters

A clock-like fairy featured in Pretty Cure Miracle Leap who represents "tomorrow". She has the power to create Miraclun Lights, and is being chased down by Refrain.

The main antagonist in Pretty Cure Miracle Leap, and a spirit who represents "yesterday" and has the power to turn back time. He is after Miraclun so that he can prevent her from making time progress onwards, in order to repeatedly relive the same day. Despite his sheer power and transforming himself to overpower the Cures opposing him, he is ultimately defeated by Super Miracle Grace using Healing Time Liberation.

A popular model who calls herself the Dream Arle Princess.

Kaguya's mother, who created the Dream Arle system.

The main antagonist of Healin' Good Pretty Cure: GoGo! Big Transformation! The Town of Dreams.

Media

Anime

On October 23, 2019, the Japan Patent office reported a filing for the series. On November 28, 2019, Toei Animation opened the site for Healin' Good PreCure. A baton pass featuring Cure Star, the lead cure of the previous Pretty Cure season Star Twinkle PreCure, and Cure Grace, along with Fuwa and Rate was shown at the end of episode 49, the final episode of Star Twinkle PreCure. The series is directed by Yoko Ikeda, with Junko Komura handling series' composition, Naoko Yamaoka designing the characters, and Shiho Terada composing the music. It began airing on ANN on February 2, 2020, with an announcement show in Sunshine City, Tokyo that was broadcast live on YouTube the day before the series' premiere. The 13th episode, originally scheduled to air on April 26, 2020, was postponed until June 28, 2020, due to the COVID-19 pandemic, with the series re-airing select episodes during this time. Toei Animation and Guild Studio use Unreal Engine 4 for the ending animations. Toei Animation Inc. and Crunchyroll began streaming the series with subtitles in North America, Australia, New Zealand, South Africa, and Latin America on June 28, 2020.

Video releases
The series is released on both DVD and Blu-ray via Pony Canyon in Japan. The first DVD volumes were released on July 22, 2020, while the first Blu-ray volume was first released on September 16, 2020.

Film
Characters from the series appear in the crossover film , which also features characters from Hugtto! PreCure and Star Twinkle PreCure. The film was originally scheduled for release on March 20, 2020, but had been delayed until October 31, 2020 (Halloween) due to the COVID-19 pandemic.

A standalone film, titled   premiered on March 20, 2021. The film is a crossover between Healin' Good Pretty Cure series and Yes! PreCure 5 GoGo!, the 5th series in the franchise.

Manga
Futago Kamikita wrote and illustrated the manga adaptation of the series, which began serialization on Kodansha's Shōjo magazine Nakayoshi in March 2020. The first Tankobon volume is released on September 11, 2020, while the second volume was released on March 12, 2021.

Music

Opening

Endings

Insert Song

Albums

Notes

References

External links
Official website 
Official website (Asahi) 

2020 anime television series debuts
Anime productions suspended due to the COVID-19 pandemic
Crunchyroll anime
Environmental television
Kodansha manga
Magical girl anime and manga
Pretty Cure
Shōjo manga
Television series about viral outbreaks
Television shows about disability
Toei Animation television
TV Asahi original programming